Kudumbam (English: Family) is a 1967 Indian Malayalam film, directed by M. Krishnan Nair and produced by Muhammad Assam. The film stars Prem Nazir, Sathyan, Sheela and Adoor Bhasi in the lead roles. The film had musical score by R. Sudarsanam.

Cast
Prem Nazir
Sathyan
Sheela
Adoor Bhasi
T. S. Muthaiah
Pankajavalli

Soundtrack
The music was composed by R. Sudarsanam and lyrics was written by Vayalar Ramavarma.

References

External links
 

1967 films
1960s Malayalam-language films
Indian drama films
Films with screenplays by Thoppil Bhasi
Films scored by R. Sudarsanam
Films directed by M. Krishnan Nair